Jean Barker (20 August 1919 – 7 June 2013) was a British film editor active from the 1940s through the 1960s. She frequently cut director Muriel Box's films.

Barker later resided in Ivybridge, Devon, and died on 7 June 2013, at the age of 93.

Selected filmography 
 The Piper's Tune (1962)
 Too Young to Love (1959)
 Subway in the Sky (1959)
 A Novel Affair (1957)
 Loser Takes All (1956)
 Eyewitness (1956)
 Simon and Laura (1955)
 The Beachcomber (1954)
 Both Sides of the Law (1953)
 Tread Softly (1952)
 Mr. Lord Says No (1952)
 Traveller's Joy (1950)
 Once Upon a Dream (1949)
 Quartet (1949)
 The Calendar (1948)
 The Upturned Glass (1947)

References

External links

1919 births
2013 deaths
British film editors
British women film editors